Rona Una McKenzie  (20 August 1922 – 24 July 1999) was a New Zealand cricketer, and was the first Maori to captain the New Zealand women's cricket team. She played as an all-rounder, batting right-handed and bowling right-arm medium. She appeared in seven Test matches for New Zealand between 1954 and 1961, captaining in them all. McKenzie's highest score was 61 as she scored 295 runs at an average of 22.69, and she took 8 wickets at 26.75, with a best bowling of 4 for 18. She played domestic cricket for Auckland.

Her first Test series was on the 1954 tour of England. She played in all three Tests, losing the series one-nil. 1956–57 saw a tour to Australia, and one Test, which was lost. England toured New Zealand in 1957–58 playing two drawn Tests, and Australia in 1960–61, when one drawn Test was played.

In the 1975 New Year Honours, McKenzie was appointed a Member of the Order of the British Empire, for services to women's cricket.

References

External links
 
 

1922 births
1999 deaths
People from Takapau
New Zealand women cricketers
New Zealand women Test cricketers
New Zealand women cricket captains
New Zealand women's Test captains
Auckland Hearts cricketers
New Zealand Members of the Order of the British Empire
Sportspeople from the Hawke's Bay Region